The American rock band Fever 333 has released one studio album, two extended plays and 10 singles.

Studio albums

Extended plays

Singles

As lead artist

As featured artist

Music videos

References

Discographies of American artists
Rock music group discographies